Chad Hauptfleisch (born 25 January 1988) is a South African cricketer. He played two first-class and two List A matches for KwaZulu-Natal in 2007 and 2008.

In August 2019, he was named in the Cayman Islands cricket team's Twenty20 International (T20I) squad for the Regional Finals of the 2018–19 ICC T20 World Cup Americas Qualifier tournament. He made his T20I debut for the Cayman Islands against Canada on 18 August 2019.

References

External links
 

1988 births
Living people
Caymanian cricketers
Cayman Islands Twenty20 International cricketers
South African cricketers
KwaZulu-Natal cricketers
Place of birth missing (living people)